Delhi Capitals are a Twenty20 franchise cricket team based in Delhi, India. The team plays in the Indian Premier League and competed in the 2019 edition of the competition between March and May 2019. In December 2018, the team changed its name from the Delhi Daredevils. The Capitals started their campaign with a 37 run victory over three-time champions Mumbai. The Capitals finally entered the playoffs after 7 years, and they won their first-ever playoffs match. The Capitals ended up as 2nd runners-up in the playoffs.

Background

Player retention and auction

In November 2018, the team retained 14 players from their 2018 squad: Shreyas Iyer, Rishabh Pant, Prithvi Shaw, Amit Mishra, Avesh Khan, Harshal Patel, Rahul Tewatia, Jayant Yadav, Manjot Kalra, Colin Munro, Chris Morris, Kagiso Rabada, Sandeep Lamichhane and Trent Boult. In addition they acquired Shikhar Dhawan in a trade from Sunrisers Hyderabad, trading Vijay Shankar, Abhishek Sharma and Shahbaz Nadeem for Dhawan.

In the 2019 player auction in December, they purchased 10 new players: Colin Ingram, Axar Patel, Hanuma Vihari, Sherfane Rutherford, Ishant Sharma, Keemo Paul, Jalaj Saxena, Ankush Bains, Nathu Singh and  Bandaru Ayyappa.

Transfers
Shikhar Dhawan was acquired from Sunrisers Hyderabad with Vijay Shankar, Shahbaz Nadeem and Abhishek Sharma moving from Delhi in return.

Squad
The following players were retained:

The franchise then added the following players:

Coaching and support staff 
 Head coach – Ricky Ponting
 Assistant coach – Mohammad Kaif
 Fast bowling coach – James Hopes
 Spin bowling coach – Samuel Badree
 Physiotherapist – Sumeshen Moodley
Source:

Season

League table

Results by match

Fixtures

League stage

Playoffs
Eliminator

Qualifier 2

Statistics

Most runs

 Source:Cricinfo

Most wickets

 Source:Cricinfo

Awards and achievements
The following players won player of the match awards during the season:

References

External links
IPL team Delhi Daredevils web page on official IPL T20 website - IPLT20.com
The Official Delhi Daredevils Site

2019 Indian Premier League
Delhi Capitals seasons